Herbert Robinson (29 December 1876 – 2 May 1919) was an Australian politician who was a Nationalist member of the Legislative Assembly of Western Australia from 1917 until his death, representing the seat of Albany.

Robinson was born in Red Hill, Victoria, to Irish parents, Margaret (née Thomson) and John Robinson. His family moved to Albany, Western Australia, in June 1878, where he spent his early childhood. He and his older brother, Robert Thomson Robinson (also a future MP), were both sent to Adelaide to be educated, attending Prince Alfred College. After leaving school, Robinson returned to Albany to work for Drew Robinson & Co., his father's department store. He eventually became a junior partner in the store. In November 1912, Robinson was elected Mayor of Albany, serving until November 1915. Joining the newly created Nationalist Party, he successfully stood for parliament at the 1917 state election, defeating a former premier, John Scaddan. He joined his brother, the member for Canning, as a member of parliament. Robinson died in Perth in May 1919, aged only 42. He had moved there to aid his recovery from an ongoing illness, with his death having been preceded several months of declining health.

References

1876 births
1919 deaths
Australian Methodists
Australian people of Irish descent
Mayors of Albany, Western Australia
Members of the Western Australian Legislative Assembly
People from Albany, Western Australia
People educated at Prince Alfred College
Nationalist Party of Australia members of the Parliament of Western Australia